Ian Ayres (born 1959) is an American lawyer and economist. Ayres is a professor at the Yale Law School and at the Yale School of Management.

Early life and education
Ayres grew up in Kansas City, Missouri, where he graduated from Pembroke Country Day School in 1977. He played varsity basketball, ran cross country, and served as executive editor of their high school newspaper. Ayres wrote an op-ed piece their senior year called "Black Like Me" (named for the 1961 book of the same name), a controversial piece detailing the consequences of their checking the "African- American" box for race on his PSAT, which led to consideration for academic awards. Ayres graduated summa cum laude in 1981 from Yale University with a dual degree in Russian studies and economics. Ayres then received their J.D. at Yale Law School in 1986, where Ayres was an editor of the Yale Law Journal. Ayres received their Ph.D. in economics at the Massachusetts Institute of Technology in 1988.

Career
Ayres has taught at Northwestern University School of Law, the University of Virginia School of Law, the Moscow State Institute of International Relations Cardoza Law Institute, the University of Iowa College of Law, the University of Illinois College of Law, Stanford Law School, the University of Toronto Law School, and Yale University.

Since 1994, Ayres has served as the William K. Townsend professor at the Yale Law School and is a professor at the Yale School of Management. Ayres teaches antitrust, civil rights, commercial law, contracts, corporations, corporate finance, law and economics, property, and quantitative methods. In 2006, Ayres was elected a fellow of the American Academy of Arts and Sciences, and also currently serves as a research associate at the National Bureau of Economic Research'. Ayres has previously served as a research fellow of the American Bar Foundation and has clerked for James K. Logan of the Tenth Circuit Court of Appeals. In a post-conviction petition, Ayres was successful in vacating the death sentence for his client.

Ayres has published eight books and over 100 articles in law reviews and magazines on a variety of subjects, and has been ranked as one of the 250 most prolific and most-cited legal scholars of his generation.

In 2007, Ayres co-founded StickK, a web startup enabling users to enter commitment contracts to reach personal goals.

Ayres currently serves on the Advisory Council of Represent.Us, a nonpartisan anti-corruption organization.

Controversy 
In a September 2007 review of Ayres's book Super Crunchers, the New York Times''' David Leonhardt wrote that he "came across two sentences about a doctor in Atlanta that were nearly identical to two sentences I wrote in this newspaper last year." Leonhardt was particularly disturbed that "many readers will surely assume that Ayres witnessed some events" that Ayres did not.

On October 4, the Yale Daily News reported that it had found nine passages in the book, some more than a couple paragraphs long, that were identical or similar to those in the Times and four other publications. In reference to Ayres's case and a similar one in Illinois, George Washington University professor of English Margaret Soltan wrote in Inside Higher Ed: "Both men simply stuck passages from other writers into their text when it suited them, and gave either minimal or no attribution. In some of the passages in question, neither used quotation marks, even when he quoted at length, verbatim."

After some controversy over three weeks, Ayres apologized and said: "in several brief instances in the book, my language is too close to the sourced material and I should have used quotation marks to set it apart from my text." However, The Chronicle of Higher Education noted that Ayres insisted: "his citations are proper for a book intended for a popular audience but that he will make changes in future printings of the book."  Critics were not satisfied with Ayres's explanation that he had simply made a mistake nor did critics accept that these practices were acceptable in popular books.  Inside Higher Ed noted that the same behavior by students is "severely sanctioned."  Professors at other universities were quite critical of Ayres's explanation and pointed out that the method used by the Yale Daily News to discover plagiarized passages was unlikely to catch them all."Plagiarism II: Yours, Mine, and Oz," Inside Higher Ed, October 9, 2007.

Personal life
Ayres married Jennifer Gerarda Brown, the Dean of the Quinnipiac University School of Law, in 1993. They have two kids. He supports various gay rights and marriage equality causes, including Freedom to Marry.

Publications
Ian Ayres's books include:
 
 
 
 2nd ed, 2006, 
 
 
 
 
 
 9th edition with Gregory Klass, 2018, 
 
 
 

Ian Ayres's two most well-known articles are:
 “Fair Driving: Gender and Race Discrimination in Retail Car Negotiations”, 104 Harvard Law Review 817 (1991)
 “Filling Gaps in Incomplete Contracts: An Economic Theory of Default Rules”, with Robert Gertner, 99 Yale Law Journal 87 (1989)

References

External links
 Ian Ayres's profile at Yale Law School
 
 Why Not? How to Use Everyday Ingenuity to Solve Problems Big and Small , with Ian Ayres and Barry Nalebuff
 Ayres uncovers hidden bias in racial stats in the Harvard Law Record''
 

Living people
1959 births
Place of birth missing (living people)
Fellows of the American Academy of Arts and Sciences
American social sciences writers
MIT School of Humanities, Arts, and Social Sciences alumni
Yale Law School alumni
Yale University faculty
Northwestern University faculty
University of Virginia faculty
University of Illinois Urbana-Champaign faculty
Stanford Law School faculty
Academic staff of the University of Toronto
University of Iowa College of Law faculty